Robby Kelley (born May 26, 1990) is an American alpine ski racer from Starksboro, Vermont. Kelley specializes in the technical events of Slalom and Giant Slalom. He made his World Cup debut on October 27, 2012, and has represented the U.S. the World Championships in 2013 and 2017. He helped found Redneck Racing along with Andrew McNealus and Tucker Marshall. They are a team of independent Vermont racers.  

In 2019 he started Castleton University and will be playing football with them and skiing for the Division III Spartans.

Family 
He is one of the Skiing Cochrans, the son of Lindy Cochran Kelley, nephew of Barbara Ann, Marilyn, and Bobby Cochran, brother of Tim and Jessica Kelley, and cousin of Ryan Cochran-Siegle and Jimmy Cochran.

World Cup results

Season standings

Other Results
1 Podium in European Cup
7 Podiums in Nor-Am Cup
2012 US National Giant Slalom Champion

References

1990 births
Living people
American male alpine skiers
Sportspeople from Burlington, Vermont
Vermont Catamounts skiers